is a Japanese football player. He plays for Veertien Mie.

Career
Kenshiro Tanioku joined J1 League club; Matsumoto Yamaga FC in 2015. April 8, he debuted in J.League Cup (v Ventforet Kofu). In 2016, he moved to Azul Claro Numazu.

Club statistics
Updated to 13 December 2021.

Honours
 Blaublitz Akita
 J3 League (1): 2020

References

External links
Profile at Matsumoto Yamaga
Profile at Numazu
Profile at Toyama
Profile at Akita

1992 births
Living people
Juntendo University alumni
Association football people from Mie Prefecture
Japanese footballers
J1 League players
J2 League players
J3 League players
Japan Football League players
Matsumoto Yamaga FC players
Azul Claro Numazu players
Kataller Toyama players
Blaublitz Akita players
Veertien Mie players
Association football defenders